Trevor Nyasha Madondo (22 November 1976 – 11 June 2001) was a Zimbabwean cricketer who played in three Test matches and 13 One Day Internationals from 1998 to 2001.

Growing up, Madondo attended Lilfordia School and Falcon College. At Falcon. he also played hockey and rugby union. He gave up his studies at Rhodes University to become a full-time cricketer. A middle-order batsman, he hit his highest first-class score in his last Test when he scored 74 not out against New Zealand in 2000–01.

He died a few months later at the age of 24 from malaria. He was the fifth-youngest Test player to die. In November 2008, his brother Tafadzwa Madondo died in a motorbike accident while vacationing in Bali.

References

External links

1976 births
2001 deaths
Alumni of Falcon College
Zimbabwe Test cricketers
Zimbabwe One Day International cricketers
Zimbabwean cricketers
Mashonaland cricketers
Matabeleland cricketers
Deaths from malaria
Infectious disease deaths in Zimbabwe